Deben may refer to:
 Deben (unit), a weight unit used in ancient Egypt
 River Deben, a river in Suffolk, England
 John Gummer, Baron Deben
 Deben, a variant spelling of Dibeng, Northern Cape, South Africa

See also
 Debden (disambiguation)